
This article presents a timeline of events in the history of the United Kingdom from AD 1900 until AD 1929. For a narrative explaining the overall developments, see the related History of the British Isles.

United Kingdom

England

Scotland

Wales

See also 
 Timeline of British history
 History of England
 History of Ireland
 History of Northern Ireland
 History of Scotland
 History of Wales
 History of the United Kingdom

British history timelines